Malverde is an American hip-hop artist. He got his name from Jesús Malverde, the popular Robin Hood character of Mexican folklore.

Biography
A son of Mexican farm laborers, this Coachella, California native has dedicated himself to study and poetry, first writing lyrics referring to the legendary Jesus Malverde, and then developing raps around street life and culture.

Malverde released his first album, Mi Palabra (My Word) in May 2004. In 2007 Malverde received even greater acknowledgement from the music community with hit "Vato," a collaboration with Snoop Dogg, and his album La Leyenda Continua, a release from Universal Music Group and Machete Music.

Malverde was signed on as an MTV Tr3s artist where he exposed his fans to the single 'Este Camino.'

He attended the University of California Riverside where he joined La Union Estudiantil de la Raza (UER). UER is a Latino organization focused on community service and academics.

References

American male rappers
American musicians of Mexican descent
Hispanic and Latino American musicians
People from Coachella, California
Living people
21st-century American rappers
21st-century American male musicians
Year of birth missing (living people)